The 25th Annual South African Music Awards ceremony was held   at the Sun City Arena in North West on June 1, 2019. It aired live on SABC 1. The show was hosted by Bob Mabena, Melanie Bala, Twasa Seoke and hip-hop star Khuli Chana.

The list of nominees was announced on April 25, 2019. HHP, TKZee & Mango Groove received the Lifetime Achievement Award at this years show.

Winners and nominees
Nominees are as listed below. Winners are in bold.

Album of the Year
Sjava – Umqhele
Black Coffee – Music is King
 Black Motion – Moya Wa Taola
Vusi Nova – Manyan-nyan
Zonke – L.O.V.E

Female Artist of the Year
Sho Madjozi – Limpopo Champions League
Busiswa – Summer Life
Kelly Khumalo – Unleashed
Lebo Sekgobela – Umusa
Zonke  - L.O.V.E

Male Artist of the Year
Black Coffee – Music is King
Anatii – IYEZA
Nakhane – You will not die
Sjava  - Umqhele
Thokozani Langa  - Iyabuza Induna

Newcomer of the Year
Sho Madjozi – Limpopo Champions League
Simmy – Tugela Fairy
Mlindo The Vocalist – Emakhaya
Paxton – This is me
Sun-El Musician – Africa to the World

Duo/Group of the Year
Black Motion – Moya Wa Taola
Tshwane Gospel Choir – The Next Revival
Spirit of Praise – Spirit of Praise Vol.7
Ofeleba – Hi & Low
Encore – Segarona

Best Rock Album
Dan Patlansky – Perfection Kills
CrashCarBurn – Headlights
Hellcats – The Hex and the Healer
The Black Cat Bones – Here is a Knife
The Parlotones – China

Best Pop Album
Tresor – Nostalgia
Jarrad Ricketts – Break the Rules
Paxton – This is me
Majozi – Majozi
Tholwana – 2.0.1.5

Beste Pop Album
Snotkop – SOUS
4 Werke -  4 by 4
The Rockets  - Sonskyn
Brendan Peyper – Dis Nie Sonde Nie
Jan Bloukaas – Lewe

Best Afro Pop Album
Sjava – Umqhele
Kelly Khumalo – Unleashed
Mlindo The Vocalist – Emakhaya
Simmy – Tugela Fairy
Vusi Nova – Manyan-Nyan

Best Jazz Album
Bokani Dyer Trio – Neo Native
Thandi Ntuli - Exiled
Sibusiso Mash Mashiloane - Closer to Home
Tune Recreation Committee - Afrika Grooves with the Tune Recreation Committee
Mandisi Dyantyis - Somandla

Best R&B/Soul Album
Zonke – L.O.V.E
Kabomo – All Things Red
Mlu – A Day For The Universe
Lady X – Love.Life.Complicated
Nicksoul – Therapy

Best Adult Contemporary Album
Ard Matthews – IImpossible Machines
Watershed -  Harbour
Roan Ash – Whiskey to my Soul
Georgetown – The Dog Show
8 Misses Croon – ...Like never before

Beste Kontemporere Musiek Album
Coenie de Villiers – Pure Coenie
Almero – Maandag
Douvoordag – Die Avontuur
Jan Blohm – Die Liefde Album
Refentse – Liefdegenerasie

Best Hip Hop Album
Nasty C – Strings and Bling
AKA – Touch my Blood
Emtee – DIY2
Jabba X – #FGTBB
Kid X – Thank Da King

Best Reggae Album
Black Dillinger – Mavara is King
The Meditators – Explosion
Ras Vuyo - Diversion
Botanist – Game Changer
Bongo Riot – Next Levels

Best Adult Contemporary Album
Watershed - Harbour
Roan Ash - Whiskey to my Soul
Georgetown - The Dog Show
Ard Matthews - Impossible Machines
8 Misses Croon -...Like never before

Remix of the Year
Spikiri -  King Don Father
Busiswa – Summer Life
Distruction Boyz - It Was All A Dream
DJ Maphorisa – Gqom Wave Vol.2
Sho Madjozi – Limpopo Champions League

Best Dance Album
Black Motion – Moya Wa Taola
DJ Fistaz  - Mixwell Summer
Sun-El Musician – Africa To The World
Mobi Dixon – 10 Steps Forward
Black Coffee – Music is King

Best Kwaito/Gqom/Amapiano
Zakwe -  Sebentin ft. Refiloe Maele Phoolo, Jabulani Tsambo; Lesego Moiloa; Senzo Mfundo Vilakazi; Ncazelo Mtolo
DJ Capital – Skebe Dep Dep ft. Kwesta, Kid X, Reason, Youngsta CPT and Stogie T
Prince Kaybee – Club Controller
SPHEctacula and DJ Naves – Bhampa
Zakes Bantwini – Bang Bang Bang

Collaboration of the year
Nakhane – You will Not Die
Breindy and Matt – Ruth Ave
Gabi Motuba- Tefiti Goddess of Creation
Jeremy Loops  - Critical As Water
Sannie Fox – My Soul Got Stranger

Best Live Audio Visual Recording
Cassper Nyovest – Fill up Orlando Stadium
Neyi Zimu – Another Level of Worship
Krone Various Artists – Krone 5
Jabu Hlongwane – Crosspower Experience 3
Spirit of Praise Vol 7 -  Spirit of Praise 7

Best Alternative Album
Black Coffee – Drive ft. David Guetta and Delilah Montagu
Sun-El Musician – Sonini ft. Simmy and Lelo Kamao
Sun-El Musician – Ntaba Ezikude ft. Simmy
Dj Sumbody – Monate Mpolaye ft. Cassper Nyovest, Thebe and Vettis
Black Coffee – Wish You Were Here featuring Msaki

Best African Indigenous Faith Album
Ithimba Le-Africa – Sesiphunyukile
Trust in Christ Ministries – Elami Igama
The General Isitimela – Amen Ezulwini
In Zion of Christ -  Izinyembezi
Christ Worshippers Mass Choir – Nkosi Ngiyakuthanda

Best Traditional Faith Music Album
Spirit of Praise 7 – Spirit of Praise Vol.7
Lebo Sekgobela – Umusa
Paul K – Time of God Manifest
Sipho Ngwenya – Intimate Worship Season 3
Kholeka – ‘’’Your Word - Alibuyi Lilambatha Izwi Lakho

Best Contemporary Faith Music Album
We Will Worship – Seasons Volume 1
Tshwane Gospel Choir – The Next Revival
Khaya Mthethwa – All About Jesus
Neyi Zimu – Another Level of Worship
Ntokozo Mbambo – Moments in Time

Best Maskandi Album
Sgwebo Sentambo – Yekani Umona
Thokozani Langa – Iyabuza Induna
Ofeleba – Hi & Low
Mbuzeni – Ungishiyelani
Ichwane Lebhaca – Imali Yesoso

Rest of Africa Artist
Diamond Platnumz – A Boy From Tandale
Kommanda Obbs – Kommanda Obbs
Mr Eazi – Lagos to London
Nixon – Who We Are
Oliver Mtukudzi – Hany'ga

Best Traditional Album
Candy – Hupenyu Unenge Viri
Vhavhenda Cultural Group – Tshianda Nguvhoni
University of Limpopo Choristers & Kwazulu-Natal Philharmonic Orchestra  - Africa Tivule
Tswelelang Cultural Dancers – Motho Wa Me
Mzimkhulu Happy Boys – Nqoba izitha

Best Engineered Album 
Vusi Nova – Manyan-nyan
CH2 – Starstruck
Nasty C – Strings and Bling
Sjava – Umqhele
Hellcats – The Hex and the Healer

Best Produced Album
Nasty C – String and Bling
AKA – Touch my Blood
Kholeka - Your Word - Alibuyi Lilambatha Izwi Lakho
Mlindo The Vocalist – Emakhaya
Zonke – L.O.V.E

Music Video of the Year
Jeremy Loops – Gold
Bongeziwe Mabandla ft. Spoek Mathambo – Bawo Wam
Mafikizolo ft. Jah Prayzah  -  Mazuva Akanaka
Sho Madjozi  -  Huku
The Parlotones  - Beautiful Life

Record of the Year ( fan Voted)
Holly Rey - Deeper
AKA and Kiddominant - Fela in Versace
Sun-El Musician featuring Simmy and Lelo Kamau - Sonini
Sjava featuring Emtee - Abangani
Mlindo the Vocalist featuring Kwesta and Thabsie - Macala
Vusi Nova and Jessica Mbangeni - Asphelelanga
DJ Ganyani featuring Nomcebo - Emazulwini

Multiple wins and nominations

Special Awards
International Achievement Award

None

Lifetime Achievement Award

HHP
TKZee 
Mango Groove

Sales and Downloads Awards 

Best DVD Selling Album

Joyous Celebration 22 All for You

Best Selling Digital Artist

Joyous Celebration 22

'SAMRO/CAPASSO HIGHEST AIRPLAY COMPOSER’S AWARD'

Lady Zamar -Collide

SAMRO/CAPASSO BEST DIGITAL DOWNLOAD AWARD'
Joyous Celebration 22 All for You

Change
In 2019, When the nominations came out the "Kwaito" category was combined into the kwaito/gqom/amapiano category, this change sparked a backlash from fan and kwaito artists who were unhappy with the combination of this genre, kwaito artist Israel Matseke led the complaints committee with the hashtag #DeathOf Kwaito, saying "that combining the three "different" genres was a deliberate attempt to kill the original kwaito sound". Responding to the backlash, Nhlanhla Sibisi,the CEO of the Recording Industry of South Africa (Risa), explained their reasons behind adding gqom and amapiano to the kwaito category.

References

2019 music awards
South African Music Awards
2019 in South Africa